The men's 100 metres event at the 1992 World Junior Championships in Athletics was held in Seoul, Korea, at Olympic Stadium on 16 and 17 September.

Medalists

Results

Final
17 September
Wind: 0.0 m/s

Semifinals
17 September

Semifinal 1
Wind: +0.1 m/s

Semifinal 2
Wind: +0.4 m/s

Quarterfinals
16 September

Quarterfinal 1
Wind: +1.8 m/s

Quarterfinal 2
Wind: +1.9 m/s

Quarterfinal 3
Wind: -0.2 m/s

Quarterfinal 4
Wind: +0.6 m/s

Heats
16 September

Heat 1
Wind: +0.7 m/s

Heat 2
Wind: +3.0 m/s

Heat 3
Wind: -0.2 m/s

Heat 4
Wind: +1.4 m/s

Heat 5
Wind: +1.5 m/s

Heat 6
Wind: +2.6 m/s

Participation
According to an unofficial count, 43 athletes from 31 countries participated in the event.

References

100 metres
100 metres at the World Athletics U20 Championships